Joseph Stanley    was a professional baseball player who played outfielder in the Major Leagues in 1884 for the Baltimore Monumentals of the Union Association. He played in six games for the Monumentals and recorded five hits in 21 at-bats.

External links

Major League Baseball outfielders
Baltimore Monumentals players
19th-century baseball players
Baseball players from New Jersey
Date of birth missing
Date of death missing